Noble Johnson (April 18, 1881 – January 9, 1978), later known as Mark Noble, was an American actor and film producer. He appeared in films such as The Mummy (1932), The Most Dangerous Game (1932),  King Kong (1933) and Son of Kong (1933).

Biography
Standing 6'2" and weighing 215 pounds, Johnson had an impressive physique that made him in demand as a character actor and bit player. In the silent era, he assayed a wide variety of characters of different races in a plethora of films, primarily serials, westerns and adventure movies. While Johnson was cast as black in many films, he also played Native American and Latino parts and "exotic" characters such as Arabians or even a devil in hell in Dante's Inferno (1924).

Noble was good friends with fellow actor Lon Chaney, his schoolmate in Colorado, and was also an entrepreneur, founding, his own studio, Lincoln Motion Picture Company, in 1916 in Omaha, Nebraska, with his younger brother George Perry Johnson. The Lincoln Motion Picture Company was an African-American film company (apart from director Harry A. Gant) that produced what were called "race films", movies made for the African-American audience, which was largely ignored by the "mainstream" film industry, and was the first to produce movies portraying African-Americans as real people instead of as racist caricatures (Johnson was followed into the race film business by Oscar Micheaux and others). Johnson, who served as president of the company and was its primary asset as a star actor, helped support the studio by acting in other companies' productions such as 20,000 Leagues Under the Sea (1916), and investing his pay from those films in Lincoln. The  Lincoln Motion Picture Company moved to Los Angeles in 1917 and became defunct in 1922.

Lincoln's first picture was The Realization of a Negro's Ambition (1916). For four years, Johnson managed to keep Lincoln a going concern, primarily through his extraordinary commitment to African-American filmmaking. However, he reluctantly resigned as president in 1920 because he no longer could continue his double business life, maintaining a demanding career in Hollywood films while trying to run a studio.

In the 1920s, Johnson was a very busy character actor, appearing in silent films such as The Four Horsemen of the Apocalypse (1921) with Rudolph Valentino, Cecil B. DeMille's original The Ten Commandments (1923), The Thief of Bagdad (1924), Dante's Inferno (1924) and When a Man Loves (1927). He made the transition to sound films, appearing in The Mysterious Dr. Fu Manchu (1929) as Li Po, in Moby Dick (1930) as Queequeg to John Barrymore's Captain Ahab, and in the Boris Karloff film The Mummy (1932) as "the Nubian". He was also the Native Chief on Skull Island in the classic King Kong (1933) (and its sequel The Son of Kong, 1933) and appeared in Frank Capra's classic Lost Horizon (1937) as one of the porters. One of his later films was John Ford's She Wore a Yellow Ribbon (1949), in which he played Native American Chief Red Shirt. He retired from the movie industry in 1950.

Johnson died of natural causes on January 9, 1978, in Yucaipa, California. He is buried in the Garden of Peace at Eternal Valley Memorial Park in Newhall, California.

Selected filmography

 Intolerance (1916) as Babylonian Soldier (uncredited)
 Kinkaid, Gambler (1916) as Romero Valdez
 20,000 Leagues Under the Sea (1916) (uncredited)
 Fighting for Love (1917) as Johnny Little Bear
 Love Aflame (1917) as Cannibal King
 The Terror (1917) as Mike Tregurtha
 Mr. Dolan of New York (1917) as Thomas Jefferson Jones
 The Hero of the Hour (1917) as Native American
 The Red Ace (1917) as Little Bear
 Bull's Eye (1917) as Sweeney Bodin
 The Law of Nature (1917)
 The Lure of the Circus (1918) as Silent Andy
 The Midnight Man (1919) as Spike
 Lightning Bryce (1919) as Dopey Sam's Henchman (Episode #5) / Arnold's Butler (Episodes #12 & #13) (uncredited)
 Under Crimson Skies (1920) as Baltimore Bucko
 The Adorable Savage (1920) as Ratu Madri
 Sunset Sprague (1920) as The Crow
 The Leopard Woman (1920) as Chaké - Madame's Slave
 The Four Horsemen of the Apocalypse (1921) as Conquest (uncredited)
 The Wallop (1921) as Espinol
 The Bronze Bell (1921) as Chatterji
 Serenade (1921) as Capt. Ramirez
 The Adventures of Robinson Crusoe (1922) as Friday
 Tracks (1922) as Leon Serrano
 The Loaded Door (1922) as Blackie Lopez
 Captain Fly-by-Night (1922) as Indian (uncredited)
 Drums of Fate (1923) as Native King
 Haunted Valley (1923)
 Burning Words (1923) as Bad Pierre
 The Ten Commandments (1923) as The Bronze Man (Prologue)
 A Man's Mate (1924) as Lion
 The Thief of Bagdad (1924) as The Indian Prince
 The Midnight Express (1924) as Deputy Sheriff
 Little Robinson Crusoe (1924) as Marimba, Cannibal Chief
 Dante's Inferno (1924) as Devil Whipping Woman (uncredited)
 The Navigator (1924) as Cannibal Chief (uncredited)
 The Dancers (1925) as Ponfilo
 Adventure (1925) as Googomy
 Ben-Hur: A Tale of the Christ (1925) as Crowd Member (uncredited)
 The Gold Hunters (1925) as Wabigoon
 Hands Up! (1926) as Sitting Bull
 The Law of the Snow Country (1926) as Martell
 The Flaming Frontier (1926) as Chief Sitting Bull
 Aloma of the South Seas (1926)
 The Lady of the Harem (1926) as Tax Collector
 When a Man Loves (1927) as Aggressive Apache (uncredited)
 Red Clay (1927) as Chief Bear Paw
 The King of Kings (1927) as Charioteer
 Vanity (1927) as Bimbo, Ship's Cook
 Topsy and Eva (1927) as Uncle Tom
 Soft Cushions (1927) as The Captain of the Guard
 The Gateway of the Moon (1928) as Soriano
 Something Always Happens (1928) as The Thing
 Why Sailors Go Wrong (1928) as Native (uncredited)
 The Yellow Cameo (1928) as Smoke Dawson
 Manhattan Knights (1928) as Doc Mellis
 The Black Ace (1928)
 Yellow Contraband (1928) as Li Wong Foo
 Noah's Ark (1928) as Slave Broker
 Sal of Singapore (1928) as Erickson's 1st Mate
 Redskin (1929) as Pueblo Jim
 Black Waters (1929) as Jeelo
 The Four Feathers (1929) as Ahmed
 The Mysterious Dr. Fu Manchu (1929) as Li Po
 Mamba (1930) as Hassim (uncredited)
 Moby Dick (1930) as Queequeg
 Renegades (1930) as Youssef (uncredited)
 Kismet (1930) (uncredited)
 Son of India (1931) as Guard (uncredited)
 East of Borneo (1931) as Osman
 Safe in Hell (1931) as Bobo, Caribbean Policeman
 Murders in the Rue Morgue (1932) as Janos The Black One
 Mystery Ranch (1932) as Mudo, Henchman
 The Most Dangerous Game (1932) as Ivan
 The Mummy (1932) as The Nubian
 Nagana (1933) as Head Boatman
 White Woman (1933) as Native Chief (uncredited)
 King Kong (1933) as Native Chief
 Roman Scandals (1933) as Torturer (uncredited)
 Son of Kong (1933) as Native Chief (uncredited)
 Massacre (1934) as Indian Leader (uncredited)
 Murder in Trinidad (1934) as Queechie
 Kid Millions (1934) as Attendant (uncredited)
 The Lives of a Bengal Lancer (1935) as Ram Singh
 She (1935) as Amahaggar Chief (uncredited)
 Dante's Inferno (1935) as Devil (uncredited)
 Escape from Devil's Island (1935) as Bisco
 My American Wife (1936) as Native American Nation Leader (uncredited)
 Mummy's Boys (1936) as Tattoo Artist (uncredited)
 The Plainsman (1936) as Native American #1 with Painted Horse (uncredited)
 Lost Horizon (1937) as Leader of Porters on return journey (uncredited)
 Wee Willie Winkie (1937) as Sikh Policeman (uncredited)
 Conquest (1937) as Roustan (uncredited)
 Four Men and a Prayer (1938) as Native (uncredited)
 Mysterious Mr. Moto (1938) as Native Sergeant (uncredited)
 Hawk of the Wilderness (1938) as Mokuyi
 Frontier Pony Express (1939) as Luke Johnson, outlaw gang leader
 Juarez (1939) as Gen. Regules (uncredited)
 Union Pacific (1939) as Native American Shooting Piano (uncredited)
 Tropic Fury (1939) as Hannibal, Slave-Driver
 Drums Along the Mohawk (1939) as Indian (uncredited)
 Allegheny Uprising (1939) as Captured Delaware Native American (uncredited)
 Green Hell (1940) as Hostile, Tribe Chief (uncredited)
 The Ghost Breakers (1940) as The Zombie
 The Ranger and the Lady (1940) as Lobo
 North West Mounted Police (1940) as Indian (uncredited)
 Seven Sinners (1940) as Irate Russian (uncredited)
 Road to Zanzibar (1941) as Chief
 Hurry, Charlie, Hurry (1941) as Chief Poison Arrow
 Aloma of the South Seas (1941) as Moukali
 Shut My Big Mouth (1942) as Chief Standing Bull
 The Mad Doctor of Market Street (1942) as Native Chief Elan
 Jungle Book (1942) as Sikh
 Ten Gentlemen from West Point (1942) as Tecumseh
 Danger in the Pacific (1942) as Native Chief (uncredited)
 Night in New Orleans (1942) as Carney
 Thank Your Lucky Stars (1943) as Charlie the Indian (uncredited)
 The Desert Song (1943) as Abdel Rahmen (uncredited)
 A Game of Death (1945) as Carib
 Angel on My Shoulder (1946) as Trustee in Hell (uncredited)
 Plainsman and the Lady (1946) as Wassao
 Hard Boiled Mahoney (1947) as Hasson
 Slave Girl (1947) as Native Guard (uncredited)
 Along the Oregon Trail (1947) as Indian Chief (uncredited)
 Unconquered (1947) as Tall Ottawa Shot at Gilded Beaver (uncredited)
 The Gallant Legion (1948) as Chief Black Eagle (uncredited)
 Dream Girl (1948) as Bartender (uncredited)
 She Wore a Yellow Ribbon (1949) as Chief Red Shirt
 Rock Island Trail (1950) as Bent Creek
 North of the Great Divide (1950) as Nagura, Oseka Chief (final film role)

References

External links

Noble Johnson at the Horror Film Site

"Meet the Black Actor Who Changed Hollywood" at ozy.com

1881 births
1978 deaths
American male silent film actors
American male film actors
African-American film producers
Film producers from Missouri
20th-century American male actors
African-American male actors
Burials in California
People from Marshall, Missouri
RKO Pictures contract players
20th-century African-American people